Cirsium erisithales, the yellow thistle or yellow melancholy thistle, is a perennial herbaceous plant in the tribe Cardueae within the family Asteraceae.

Description
The stems are erect, almost hairless. This plant has just a few leaves, with tooth-shaped lobes.

Distribution
This species is widespread in southern and eastern Europe, though nowhere very common. It is present in the mountains of France, Italy, Switzerland, Austria, Poland, Ukraine, the Balkans, Greece, southern Russia, etc.

Habitat
Cirsium erisithales grows in fresh wood (beech), rocky slopes, meadows and waters edge.

References

External links
Tela botanica in French with photos
Acta Plantarum in Italian with photos

erisithales
Flora of Europe